Uwamahoro Antoinette (born 25 December 1975 in Kigali) is a Rwandan actress.

Career 
Uwamahoro Antoinette as known as "Intare y'igore","Siperansiya" has been acting in films for twenty years in Rwanda. She became famous in various Rwandan movies including Serwakira, Giramata, Mukadata, Intare y'ingore and others. In other level will be very popular in Seburikoko on Rwandan Television.

Personal life

She is the eldest of seven children.

She is married and has three children. Currently, she lives in Nyarugenge District in Nyamirambo Sector.

References 

Rwandan actresses
Living people
1975 births